Rauno Lehtiö (born 3 March 1942) is a Finnish ice hockey player. He competed in the men's tournament at the 1964 Winter Olympics.

References

External links

1942 births
Living people
Finnish ice hockey players
KOOVEE players
Olympic ice hockey players of Finland
Ice hockey players at the 1964 Winter Olympics
Ice hockey people from Tampere